The Romani people, also referred to as Roma, Sinti or Kale, depending on the sub-group, are an Indo-Aryan ethnic group which primarily lives in Europe. The Romani may have migrated from what is the modern Indian state of Rajasthan, migrating to the northwest (the Punjab region of the Indian subcontinent) around 250 BCE. Their subsequent westward migration, possibly in waves, is now believed to have occurred beginning in about 500 CE. It has also been suggested that emigration from India may have taken place in the context of the raids by Mahmud of Ghazni. As these soldiers were defeated, they were moved west with their families into the Byzantine Empire. The author Ralph Lilley Turner theorised a central Indian origin of Romani followed by a migration to Northwest India as it shares a number of ancient isoglosses with Central Indo-Aryan languages in relation to realization of some sounds of Old Indo-Aryan. This is lent further credence by its sharing exactly the same pattern of northwestern languages such as Kashmiri and Shina through the adoption of oblique enclitic pronouns as person markers. The overall morphology suggests that Romani participated in some of the significant developments leading toward the emergence of New Indo-Aryan languages, thus indicating that the proto-Romani did not leave the Indian subcontinent until late in the second half of the first millennium.

Origin

There are many different theories about their origin, as example, including that the Roma and Sinti people came from Sindh.

The Romani have been described by Diana Muir Appelbaum as unique among peoples because they have never identified themselves with a territory; they have no tradition of an ancient and distant homeland from which their ancestors migrated, nor do they claim the right to national sovereignty in any of the lands where they reside. Rather, Romani identity is bound up with the ideal of freedom expressed, in part, in having no ties to a homeland. The absence of a written history has meant that the origin and early history of the Romani people was long an enigma. Indian origin was suggested on linguistic grounds as early as the late 18th century.

In the Roma language Rom means Husband, while Romliye means Housewife, "Roma" means "Human being". Theories suggest that the ancestors of the Romani were part of the military in Northern India. One modern theory is, when there were invasions by Sultan Mahmud Ghaznavi and these soldiers were defeated, they were moved west with their families into the Byzantine Empire between AD 1000 and 1030.

The genetic evidence identified an Indian origin for Roma. Genetic evidence connects the Romani people to the descendants who emigrated from South Asia towards Central Asia during the medieval period.

Linguistic origins
Until the mid-to-late 18th century, theories about the origin of the Romani were mostly speculative. In 1782, Johann Christian Christoph Rüdiger published his research findings in which he pointed out the relationship between the Romani language and Hindustani. Subsequent work supported the hypothesis that Romani shared a common origin with the Indo-Aryan languages of Northern India.

Domari and Romani languages

Domari was once thought to be the "sister language" of Romani, the two languages had split after the Romani departed from South Asia, but based on more recent research findings, they should be considered two separate languages within the Central zone (Hindustani) Saraiki language group of languages because the differences which exist between them are extremely significant. Therefore, the Dom and the Rom are probably the descendants of two different groups of people who migrated from the Indian subcontinent in two different waves, the waves of migration occurred several centuries apart.

Genetic evidence
Further evidence for the South Asian origin of the Romanies came in the late 1990s.  Researchers doing DNA analysis discovered that Romani populations carried large frequencies of particular Y chromosomes (inherited paternally) and mitochondrial DNA (inherited maternally) that otherwise exist only in populations from South Asia.

47.3% of Romani men carry Y chromosomes of haplogroup H-M82 which is rare outside South Asia. Mitochondrial haplogroup M, most common in Indian subjects and rare outside Southern Asia, accounts for nearly 30% of Romani people. A more detailed study of Polish Roma shows this to be of the M5 lineage, which is specific to India. Moreover, a form of the inherited disorder congenital myasthenia is found in Romani subjects. This form of the disorder, caused by the 1267delG mutation, is otherwise known only in subjects of Indian ancestry. This is considered to be the best evidence of the Indian ancestry of the Romanis.

The Romanis have been described as "a conglomerate of genetically isolated founder populations". The number of common Mendelian disorders found among Romanis from all over Europe indicates "a common origin and founder effect".

A study from 2001 by Gresham et al. suggests "a limited number of related founders, compatible with a small group of migrants splitting from a distinct caste or tribal group". Also the study pointed out that "genetic drift and different levels and sources of admixture, appear to have played a role in the subsequent differentiation of populations". The same study found that "a single lineage ... found across Romani populations, accounts for almost one-third of Romani males."

A 2004 study by Morar et al. concluded that the Romanies are descended from "a founder population of common origins that has subsequently split into multiple socially divergent and geographically dispersed Romani groups". The same study revealed that this population "was founded approximately 32–40 generations ago, with secondary and tertiary founder events occurring approximately 16–25 generations ago".

There is genetic evidence of major mixing with Balkan peoples during the time of the Ottoman Empire.

Connection to the Burushos and Pamiris
The Burushos of Hunza have a paternal lineage genetic marker that is grouped with Pamiri speakers from Afghanistan and Tajikistan, and the Sinti ethnic group. This find of shared genetic haplogroups may indicate an origin of the Romani people in or around these regions.

Possible connection to the Domba people
According to a genetic study on the phylogeography of Y-chromosome haplogroup H1a1a-M82 in 2012, the ancestors of present scheduled tribes and scheduled caste populations of northern India, traditionally referred to collectively as the Ḍoma, are the likely ancestral populations of modern European Roma.

Mitochondrial or Y-chromosome haplotype studies provide valuable information, but a limitation of these types of studies is that they each represent only one instantiation of the genealogical process. Autosomal data permits simultaneous analysis of multiple lineages, which can provide novel information about population history. According to a genetic study on autosomal data on Roma the source of South Asian Ancestry in Roma is North-West India. The two populations showing closest relatedness to Roma were Punjabis and Kashmiris which also happen to have the highest West Eurasian related ancestry amongst South Asians. However according to a study on genome-wide data published in 2019 the putative origin of the proto Roma involves a Punjabi group with low levels of West Eurasian ancestry.   The classical and mtDNA genetic markers suggested the closest affinity of the Roma with domba origin and Punjabi populations from Rajasthan and the Punjab respectively.

Early records
Early records of itinerant populations from India begin as early as the Sassanid period. British linguist Donald Kenrick notes the first recorded presence of Zott in Baghdad in AD 420, Khanaqin in AD 834.

Contemporary scholars have suggested one of the first written references to the Romanies, under the term "Atsingani", (derived from the Greek ἀτσίγγανοι - atsinganoi), dates from the Byzantine era during a time of famine in the 9th century. In the year AD 800, Saint Athanasia gave food to "foreigners called the Atsingani" near Thrace. Later, in AD 803, Theophanes the Confessor wrote that Emperor Nikephoros I had the help of the "Atsingani" to put down a riot with their "knowledge of magic". However, the Atsingani were a Manichean sect that disappeared from chronicles in the 11th century. "Atsinganoi" was used to refer to itinerant fortune tellers, ventriloquists and wizards who visited the Emperor Constantine IX in the year 1054.

Roma skeletal remains exhumed from Castle Mall at Norwich, UK were radiocarbon dated by liquid scintillation spectrometry to circa 930-1050AD.

Arrival in Europe

In 1323 Simon Simeonis, an Irish Franciscan friar, described people in likeness to the "atsingani" living in Crete: We also saw outside this city [Candia] a tribe of people, who worship according to the Greek rite, and assert themselves to be of the race of Cain. These people rarely or never stop in one place for more than thirty days, but always, as if cursed by God, are nomad and outcast. After the thirtieth day they wander from field to field with small, oblong, black, and low tents, like those of the Arabs, and from cave to cave, because the place inhabited by them becomes after the term of thirty days so full of vermin and other filth that it is impossible to live in their neighbourhood.

In 1350 Ludolf von Sudheim mentioned a similar people with a unique language whom he called Mandapolos, a word which some theorize was possibly derived from the Greek word Mantipolos - Μαντιπόλος "frenzied" from mantis - μάντις (meaning "prophet, fortune teller") and poleo - πολέω.

Around 1360, a fiefdom (called the Feudum Acinganorum) was established in Corfu. It mainly used Romani serfs and the Romanies on the island were subservient.

By the 14th century, the Romanies had reached the Balkans and Bohemia; by the 15th century, Germany, France, Italy, Spain and Portugal; and by the 16th century, Russia, Denmark, Scotland and Sweden. (although DNA evidence from mid-11th century skeletons in Norwich suggest that at least a few individuals may have arrived earlier, perhaps due to Viking enslavement of Romani from the eastern Mediterranean or liaisons with the Varangians).

Some Romanies migrated from Persia through North Africa, reaching Europe via Spain in the 15th century. Romanies began immigrating to the United States in colonial times, with small groups in Virginia and French Louisiana. Larger-scale immigration began in the 1860s, with groups of Romnichal from Britain. The largest number immigrated in the early 20th century, mainly from the Vlax group of Kalderash. Many Romanies also settled in Latin America.

According to historian Norman Davies, a 1378 law passed by the governor of Nauplion in the Greek Peloponnese confirming privileges for the "atsingani" is "the first documented record of Romany Gypsies in Europe".  Similar documents, again representing the Romanies as a group that had been exiled from Egypt, record them reaching Braşov, Transylvania in 1416; Hamburg, Holy Roman Empire in 1418; and Paris in 1427.  A chronicler for a Parisian journal described them as dressed in a manner that the Parisians considered shabby, and reports that the Church had them leave town because they practiced palm-reading and fortune-telling.

Their early history shows a mixed reception. Although 1385 marks the first recorded transaction for a Romani slave in Wallachia, they were issued safe conduct by Sigismund of the Holy Roman Empire in 1417. Romanies were ordered expelled from the Meissen region of Germany in 1416, Lucerne in 1471, Milan in 1493, France in 1504, Aragon in 1512, Sweden in 1525, England in 1530 (see Egyptians Act 1530), and Denmark in 1536. In 1510, any Romani found in Switzerland was ordered to be executed, and in 1554 a statute was passed in England that mandated all Romani in the country leave or face execution. Similar legislation was passed in numerous European nations, including Denmark in 1589, Sweden in 1637, whereas Portugal began deportations of Romanies to its colonies in 1538.

Later, a 1596 English statute, however, gave Romanies special privileges that other wanderers lacked; France passed a similar law in 1683. Catherine the Great of Russia declared the Romanies "crown slaves" (a status superior to serfs), but also kept them out of certain parts of the capital. In 1595, Ştefan Răzvan overcame his birth into slavery, and became the Voivode (Prince) of Moldavia.

In Wallachia, Transylvania and Moldavia, Romanies were enslaved for five centuries, until abolition in the mid-19th century.

In the late 19th century, the Romani culture inspired in their neighbors a wealth of artistic works.  Among the most notable works are Carmen and La Vie de Bohème.

Ottoman Empire
In the Ottoman Empire, Muslim Romani people were preferred, in contrast to the Christian Roma. Muslim Roma were settled in Rumelia (Balkans) from Anatolia like the Arlije or Cyprus like the Gurbeti. There were also conversions to Islam in order to achieve better living conditions under Ottoman rule. There was a Sanjak of the Çingene, established for Muslim Roma in Rumelia from 1520 until the end of the Ottoman Empire, which was overseen by a Muslim Rom Baro. Muslim Roma were able to migrate from one part of the country to another within the vast Ottoman Empire. So Muslim Roma from Anatolia wandered to the Balkans, from the Balkans to Egypt, or migrated to the Crimean peninsula, there and back, again and again. In the case of the Zargari tribe, they migrated once from Ottoman Rumelia via Ottoman Damascus to the Persian Empire. The same Muslim Roma group did not always live in the same place; other groups often took their places. As an example, the popular belly dance came to Istanbul from Egypt with Roma groups after 1517.
In addition to their own native Balkan Romani, some Muslim Romani groups adopted the Turkish language, and deny their real Roma origin, and consider themselves as Turks. Other Muslim Romani groups adopted the Albanian language or one of the many South Slavic dialects, some mixed the language and create a Para-Romani, and others gradually forgot their mother tongue, and only speak the language of the majority population. Genetic studies showed the influence of the Ottoman empire of the Balkans. The Dom and Lom people also lived in the Ottoman Empire. Turkey is the only country where Romani, Domari and Lom people live in.

Forced assimilation
In 1758, Maria Theresa of Austria began a program of assimilation to turn Romanies into ujmagyar (new Hungarians). The government built permanent huts to replace mobile tents, forbade travel, and forcefully removed children from their parents to be fostered by non-Romani. By 1894, the majority of Romanies counted in a Hungarian national census were sedentary. In 1830, Romani children in Nordhausen were taken from their families to be fostered by Germans.

Russia also encouraged settlement of all nomads in 1783, and the Polish introduced a settlement law in 1791. Bulgaria and Serbia banned nomadism in the 1880s.

In 1783, racial legislation against Romanies was repealed in the United Kingdom, and a specific "Turnpike Act" was established in 1822 to prevent nomads from camping on the roadside, strengthened in the Highways Act of 1835.

Persecution

In 1530, England issued the Egyptians Act which banned Romani from entering the country and required those living in the country to leave within 16 days. Failure to do so could result in the confiscation of property, imprisonment and deportation. The act was amended with the Egyptians Act 1554, which ordered the Romani to leave the country within a month. Non-complying Romanies were executed.

In 1538, the first anti-ziganist (anti-Romani) legislation was issued in Moravia and Bohemia, which were under Habsburg rule. Three years later, after a series of fires in Prague which were blamed on the Romani, Ferdinand I ordered them to be expelled. In 1545, the Diet of Augsburg declared that "whoever kills a Gypsy, will be guilty of no murder". The massive killing spree that resulted prompted the government to eventually step in and "forbid the drowning of Romani women and children".

In 1660, Romanies were prohibited from residence in France by Louis XIV.

In 1685, Portugal deported Romani to Brasil.

In 1710, Joseph I issued a decree declaring the extermination of Romani ordering that "all adult males were to be hanged without trial, whereas women and young males were to be flogged and banished forever." In addition, they were to have their right ears cut off in the kingdom of Bohemia and their left ear in Moravia. In 1721, Charles VI, Joseph's brother and successor, amended the decree to include the execution of adult female Romani, while children were "to be put in hospitals for education".

Pre-war organization
In 1879, a national meeting of Romanies was held in the Hungarian town of Kisfalu (now Pordašinci, Slovenia). Romanies in Bulgaria held a conference in 1919 in an attempt to demand that they be given the right to vote, and a Romani journal, Istiqbal (Future) was founded in 1923.

In the Soviet Union, the All-Russian Union of Gypsies was organized in 1925 and a journal, Romani Zorya (Romani Dawn) was published two years later. The Romengiro Lav (Romani Word) writer's circle encouraged works by authors like Nikolay Aleksandrovich Pankov and Nina Dudarova.

A General Association of the Gypsies of Romania was established in 1933 with the holding of a national conference, and the publication of two journals, Neamul Țiganesc (Gypsy Nation) and Timpul (Time). An "international" conference was organized in Bucharest the following year.

In Yugoslavia, the publication of the Romani journal Romano Lil was started in 1935.

Porajmos

During World War II and The Holocaust, the Nazis murdered 220,000 to 500,000 Romanies in a genocide which is referred to as the Porajmos. Like the Jews, they were segregated and forced to move into ghettos before they were sent to concentration or extermination camps. They were frequently killed on sight by the Einsatzgruppen, especially on the Eastern Front. 25% of European Roma perished in the genocide.

Post-war history
In Communist Central and Eastern Europe, the Romanies experienced assimilation schemes and restrictions on their cultural freedom. In public, the speaking of the Romani language and the playing of Romani music were both banned in Bulgaria. In Czechoslovakia, tens of thousands of Romanies from Slovakia, Hungary and Romania were re-settled in the border areas of the Czech lands and their nomadic lifestyle was forbidden. In Czechoslovakia, where they were considered a “socially degraded stratum,” Romani women were sterilized as part of a state policy to reduce their population. This policy was implemented with large financial incentives, threats to withhold future social welfare payments, misinformation and involuntary sterilization.

In the early 1990s, Germany deported tens of thousands of migrants to central and eastern Europe. Sixty percent of some 100,000 Romanian nationals who were deported under a 1992 treaty were Romani.

In 2005, the Decade of Roma Inclusion was launched in nine Central and Southeastern European countries in an attempt to improve the socio-economic status and increase the social inclusion of the Romani minority across the region.

A decade of Roma Inclusion 2005 - 2015 was not successful.  It initiated crucially important processes for Roma inclusion in Europe and it also provided the impetus for an EU-led effort to cover similar subject matter, the EU Framework for National Roma Integration Strategies up to 2020 (EU Framework).

America
Romanies began to immigrate to the United States during colonial times, with small groups of them settling in Virginia and French Louisiana. Larger-scale immigration began in the 1860s, with groups of Romnichal from Britain.

Czech-Canadian Exodus
In August 1997, TV Nova, a popular television station in the Czech Republic, broadcast a documentary about the situation of Romanies who had emigrated to Canada. The short report claimed that Romanies in Canada were living comfortably with support from the state, and it also claimed that they were being sheltered from racial discrimination and violence. At the time, life was particularly difficult for many Romanies who were living in the Czech Republic. As a result of the dissolution of Czechoslovakia, many Romanies were left without citizenship in either the Czech Republic or Slovakia. Following the large flood in Moravia in July, many Romanies were left homeless but they were not welcome in other parts of the country.

Almost overnight, there were reports of Romanies preparing to emigrate to Canada. According to one report, 5,000 Romanies from the city of Ostrava intended to move. The mayors of some Czech towns encouraged the exodus, offering to help pay for flights so that Romanies could leave. The following week, the Canadian Embassy in Prague was receiving hundreds of calls from Romanies every day and flights between the Czech Republic and Canada were sold out until October. In 1997, 1,285 people from the Czech Republic arrived in Canada and claimed refugee status, a rather significant jump from the 189 Czechs who did so the previous year.

Lucie Cermakova, a spokesperson at the Canadian Embassy in Prague, criticized the program, claiming that it "presented only one side of the matter and picked out only nonsensical ideas." Marie Jurkovicova, a spokesperson for the Czech Embassy in Ottawa suggested that "the program was full of half-truths, which strongly distorted reality and practically invited the exodus of large groups of Czech Romanies. It concealed a number of facts."

The movement of Romanies to Canada had been fairly easy because visa requirements for Czech citizens had been lifted by the Canadian government in April 1996. In response to the influx of Romanies, the Canadian government reinstated the visa requirements for all Czechs as of 8 October 1997.

Romani nationalism

A small Roma nationalist movement exists.

The first World Romani Congress was held near London in 1971, it was partially funded by the World Council of Churches and the Government of India. It was attended by representatives from India and 20 other countries. At the congress, the green and blue flag which was unfurled at the 1933 conference, embellished with the red, sixteen-spoked chakra, was reaffirmed as the national emblem of the Romani people, and the song , "Gelem, Gelem" was adopted as the national anthem of the Romani people.

The International Romani Union was officially established in 1977, and in 1990, the fourth World Congress declared that April 8 is the International Day of the Roma, a day to celebrate Romani culture and raise awareness of the issues which are affecting the Romani community.

In 2000, the 5th World Romani Congress issued an official declaration in which it stated that the Romany people are a non-territorial nation.

See also
Timeline of Romani history
Anti-Indian sentiment
Demographics of India
Indian people
Rajasthani people
Names of the Romani people

References

Sources